Betty Ann Bowser (August 19, 1944 – March 16, 2018) was an American journalist.

Life 
Born in Norfolk, Virginia, Bowser graduated from Granby High School, and Ohio Wesleyan University.
She started in television journalism in 1966.
From 1988 to 2013, she was a correspondent for the PBS NewsHour.

Bowser covered Hurricane Katrina, and Sexual harassment in the military.

Bowser died March 16, 2018, in Ajijic, Mexico.

References

External links 
https://www.pbs.org/newshour/health/betty-ann-bowser-trailblazer-in-television-news-dies-at-73
http://wtkr.com/2018/03/22/former-news-3-anchor-pbs-correspondent-betty-ann-bowser-dies-at-73/

1944 births
2018 deaths
Ohio Wesleyan University alumni
Journalists from Virginia
20th-century American journalists
21st-century American journalists
PBS people
American television journalists
American women television journalists
People from Ajijic
20th-century American women
21st-century American women